Bere Regis is a village and civil parish in Dorset, England, situated  north-west of Wareham. In the 2011 census the civil parish had a population of 1,745.

The village has one shop, a family-owned cheese barn, a post office, and two pubs, The Royal Oak and The Drax Arms. The parish church is St. John the Baptist Church. The village features in the Domesday Book of 1086.

History

The original settlements in the parish were Shitterton, Bere Regis village and Dodding's Farm, which are all sited by the Bere or Milborne Stream. Later settlements were small farms in the Piddle Valley to the south, first recorded between the mid 13th and mid 14th centuries.

Edward I made Bere Regis a free borough and it was an important market town for a long period, though all domestic buildings built before 1600 have since been destroyed by serious fires in the 17th, 18th and 19th centuries.

Governance

Bere Regis is in an electoral ward that bears its name and includes neighbouring Bloxworth. The ward population in the 2011 census was 1,945. The ward forms part of the parliamentary constituency of Mid Dorset and North Poole. Its Member of Parliament since 2015 is the Conservative Michael Tomlinson.

Locally, Bere Regis is governed by Dorset County Council at the county level, Purbeck District Council at the district level, and Bere Regis Parish Council at the parish level. The parish council meets once per month.

Geography

Bere Regis village is sited by the side of the small Bere River or Bere Stream, a tributary of the River Piddle, where the chalk of the Dorset Downs, to the north, dips beneath newer deposits of clay, sands and gravels. The village is situated at the western terminus of the A31 road (Guildford – Bere Regis), where it joins the A35 (Southampton – Honiton), although both roads now bypass the village.

To the south-east of the village a large conifer plantation, Wareham Forest, stretches several miles to Wareham. To the west is Dorchester, north is Blandford Forum and east is Bournemouth.

Architecture

Having suffered extensive fires throughout its history, including the most serious in 1777, the village has lost many of its older buildings. There is, however, a selection of Georgian and Victorian buildings. The nearby hamlet of Shitterton, protected by the Bere River from the fires, still retains an extensive selection of older buildings, predominantly thatch. Amongst them is the oldest residential building in the parish; the 550-year-old Honeycombe Cottage.

The oldest parts of the parish church of St John the Baptist are of the 12th century, but additions were made in the following three centuries. The tower is built of stone-and-flint chequerwork, and the timber roof of the nave is said to have been the gift of Cardinal John Morton. Features of interest include the arcades, some 16th-century seating and a number of Purbeck marble monuments. The Victorian and later stained glass is of poor quality.

Demography

In the 2011 census Bere Regis civil parish had 852 dwellings, 803 households and a population of 1,745 (867 male, 878 female).

Education

The village has one village school: Bere Regis Primary & Pre-School located in Southbrook. This is a mixed primary school for children aged 4–10.

Literature

The village featured in several novels of Thomas Hardy, most notably, Tess of the D'Urbervilles. The village was portrayed as 'Kingsbere', and the D'Urberville family was based on the Turberville family of Bere Regis. This family name has evolved to Turbyfill.

Sport and recreation

Bere Regis has an active village sports club and playing fields which can be used for different sports. Bere Regis FC are one of the oldest Football Clubs in England and in Dorset, having been formed in 1885 when they were known as the 'Arabs'. They are a well established team.

Twin towns

Bere Regis is twinned with:
 Cérences, France

See also
Bere Regis (hundred)
Regis (Place)
List of place names with royal patronage in the United Kingdom

References

External links

The Village Website
The Parish Council Website

Villages in Dorset